Walkeria is a genus of colonial bryozoans in the order Ctenostomatida.

Species
The World Register of Marine Species includes the following species in the genus:

Walkeria atlantica (Busk, 1886)
Walkeria prorepens Kubanin, 1992
Walkeria tuberosa Heller, 1867
Walkeria uva (Linnaeus, 1758)

References

Ctenostomatida
Bryozoan genera
Taxa named by John Fleming (naturalist)